Juani Feliz (born January 3, 1989) is a Dominican-American actress. She is best known for playing Isabela Benitez-Santiago in Tracy Oliver's Amazon comedy series Harlem, Carmen in Ava DuVernay's HBO Max series DMZ, and Alejandra Lopez in FX's Fleishman Is In Trouble. 

In 2022, Feliz was named one of People En Espanol's 50 Más Bellos ("50 Most Beautiful") of 2022.

Early life 
Feliz was born in the Dominican Republic and raised in the Bronx. She started acting at the age of 14 after getting involved in her first school play. She landed her first TV role at the age of 15 on Law & Order: Criminal Intent. Her acting career took a backseat when she graduated high school and studied biomedical engineering at Harvard University. After college, Feliz worked at the Wyss Institute for Biologically Inspired Engineering in Boston, where she worked on a clinical trial for a melanoma cancer vaccine and helped develop biomaterials and drug delivery systems. During this time she also completed a master's degree at Harvard. Despite her career in bioengineering, Feliz made her return to acting in 2016.

Career 
Upon her return to acting, Feliz made her big screen debut in The Purge: Election Year. Between 2016 and 2018, she guest starred on various TV series including Blue Bloods, Power, Shades of Blue, One Dollar and had a major supporting role in the film Canal Street. In 2017, she was one of the 12 actors chosen to be part of the ABC Discovers Talent Showcase. In 2019, she filmed her first network pilot as a series regular on the ABC romantic drama Until The Wedding and filmed for a major supporting role in the upcoming feature film Quiet In My Town. In 2020, Feliz won Best Supporting Actress at the Utah Film Festival for her performance in the indie short Below The Belt.

In 2021, she played Isabela Benitez-Santiago in Amazon's comedy series Harlem, from Tracy Oliver and Amy Poehler. 

In 2022, she played Carmen in the HBO Max limited series DMZ, from Ava DuVernay and Roberto Patino.  Later that year, she played Alejandra Lopez in the FX limited series Fleishman Is In Trouble, Taffy Brodesser-Akner's screen adaption of her 2019 NYT best-selling novel.  

More recently, Feliz reprised her role as Isabela Benitez-Santiago in the second season of Harlem and guest starred in episodes of NCIS: Hawaii and The Good Doctor.  

She will next be seen on The Rookie: Feds and in Alex Garland's action epic Civil War for A24.

Personal life 
Feliz is a member of the LGBTQ community. She married her wife, a Disney executive, in September 2021 in New York City.

Filmography

Film

Television

References

External links 

Actresses from New York City
LGBT actresses
Dominican-American culture
Harvard College alumni
Living people
People from the Bronx
Nationality missing
1989 births